The 2nd constituency of the Nièvre is a French legislative constituency in the Nièvre département in France.

Description

Following the 2010 redistricting of French legislative constituencies, the 2nd constituency of the Nièvre covers the largely rural east and centre of the department.  Before this, the constituency was based in the north-west of the department.

Until 2017, the constituency returned Socialists at every election since 1988 with the exception of the 1993 election. It was won by ENA graduate Christian Paul in 2012 who previously had represented Nièvre's 3rd constituency, which was combined with parts of the 2nd to form a new 2nd constituency in the 2010 redistricting.

It includes Chateau-Chinon, for many years the electoral base of President Francois Mitterrand.

Historic Representation

Election results

2022

2017

2012

 
 
 
 
 
|-
| colspan="8" bgcolor="#E9E9E9"|
|-

Sources
Official results of French elections from 2002: "Résultats électoraux officiels en France" (in French).

2